Bridei (also Brude, Bruide, Breidei or Bred) is a name shared by a number of Pictish people, including:

 Bridei I of the Picts (Brude son of Maelchon, 554–584), contemporary of Saint Columba
 Bridei II of the Picts (Brude son of Foith, 635–641)
 Bridei III of the Picts (Brude son of Bile, 672–693)
 Bridei IV of the Picts (Brude son of Der-Ilei and Dargart, 697–706)
 Bridei V of the Picts (Brude son of Fergus, 761–763)
 Bridei VI of the Picts (Brude son of Ferat, 842–843)
 Bridei VII of the Picts (Brude son of Fothel, 843–845)
 Brude son of Óengus I of the Picts, died 736

See also
 The Bridei Chronicles, a series of historical fantasy novels by Juliet Marillier about Bridei I
 Ivan Brude Stone (1907–1985), American businessman and politician